Phytoecia flavescens is a species of beetle in the family Cerambycidae. It was described by Brullé in 1833, originally under the genus Saperda. It is known from Macedonia and Greece. It contains the varietas Phytoecia flavescens var. fumigata.

References

Phytoecia
Beetles described in 1833